The Baths of Chapultepec as a series of deposits used from the pre-Columbian period until the beginning of the 20th century, to houses the waters of the springs of the hill of Chapultepec that served to provide drinking water to Mexico City. Among the remains of these are the so-called Baths of Moctezuma in Chapultepec which was recently remodeled, and the remains of some colonial baths in the Well 5 or Manantial Chico of Chapultepec.

History
When Tenochtitlan began to grow and look for alternatives to supply water to its inhabitants, the Huey Tlatoani Tenochca Chimalpopoca in 1381 requested his grandfather the Huey Tlatoani of Azcapotzalco Tezozomoc to allow him to take advantage of the waters of the springs of Chapultepec to supply the population of his city, permission granted to him and for this reason the Tenochcs began to build the aqueduct.

This aqueduct was not well performed by the Tenochcs and was one of the reasons for the war in which Tenochtitlan joined Texcoco to gain hegemony in the Valley of Mexico and then form the Aztec Triple Alliance (also known as the Aztec Empire). As the hill of Chapultepec had several springs mostly located on the south side of the hill, the Texcocans led by their Huey Tlatoani Nezahualcoyotl in 1466 carried out a series of works, between canals and reservoirs to water the aqueduct of Chapultepec, for this they built the so-called baths which were intended to increase the water level and the water pressure in the aqueduct pipeline. In addition to allowing irrigation of the Chapultepec Forest.

During the siege of Mexico City by the Spanish and their Indigenous allies, Hernán Cortés ordered the destruction of part of these baths and the taking of the site that had a small town on the west side of the hill of Chapultepec, which left the city without drinking water.

Having taken the city and determined to use it as the seat of the capital of New Spain, Hernán Cortés ordered to rebuild them, over time these baths underwent a series of modifications, tending to increase their level, which did not always mean to increase their volume. Since 1740 a decrease of the volumes of water was noticed which determined in 1929 the total closure of the baths.

At present one of them was reconstructed and only presents an exhibition of sculptures and alusional maps, this one is popularly called The Baths of Moctezuma, on the eastern side of the hemicycle dedicated to the 201 Squadron are the remains of some of the colonial baths, where you can even see pre-Columbian remains, inside it is the Well Five of Chapultepec, dependent of the Comisión Nacional del Agua. At its height the baths were not only used for it drinking water, since concessions to private individuals allowed the construction of private baths for irrigation and even public baths (in reality it was a public bath open in exchange for a payment for use).

Description
The baths were made of masonry and lime, of the several that existed there are only information available from three of them, which had the following names:
Alberca Grande or Alberca de los Llorones.
Alberca de los Nadadores.
Alberca Chica or Alberca de Moctezuma (the Baths of Moctezuma)

The Alberca Grande (Large Bath) located in what would now be the boundary fence between the forest and the Avenue of los Constituyentes was rectangular in shape, 17.47 m long and 1.39 m wide with a depth of 2.67 m or 12 m deep, this was used for irrigation in the Tacubaya area and belonged to the Count of Peñasco.

The Alberca de los Nadadores ( the Swimmer's Bath) was even more extensive but of less depth, it was located more to the east and was the first public swimming bath or spa (as it is told in Mexico City) in Mexico City.

The Alberca Chica or Alberca de Moctezuma (Small Bath or the Moctezuma's Bath) was the highest height with respect to Mexico City and it is very likely that the oldest, from this goes the pipes for aqueducts, for it was the only one of which we know the years of its renovation, (1548, 1571, 1714, and 1870), thanks to a series of lap of which were in a quarter of a pump situated at its side to provide service to the Castle of Chapultepec, these reconstructions made the bath out each time smaller and more high, this bath was studied in 1974 by archaeologists Ruben Cabrera, María Antonieta Cervantes and Felipe Solís, who found six boxes inside each other, which were reducing in size, the oldest one, which was very destroyed, was about 15 m long and was square with rounded corners, until the fourth there are traces of baked brick, dated in 1870, with the fifth and sixth there is the use of cement, this last one that could be seen before its reconstruction in 2010, had 5.70 m by side concrete ceiling and glass, a staircase of iron, at its entrance towards south was the room of bombs.

Controversies
There is a popular belief that these baths were the Baths of Moctezuma, in which he swam and cleaned, so it is believed that other characters like Emperor Maximilian used them for swimming, which would be from every point unhygienic and also there are the prohibitions that several rulers imposed on the use of those waters for bathing, if they were in the facilities of the aqueduct and the baths, in the last case it is most likely that the other baths that had a use for irrigation were used for that purpose.

See also
List of pre-columbian archaeological sites in Mexico City

References

Buildings and structures in Mexico City
Aztec sites
Spanish Colonial architecture in Mexico
Aqueducts in Mexico
Water wells
Infrastructure completed in the 14th century
Buildings and structures completed in 1548
Chapultepec
Archaeological sites in Mexico City
Indigenous peoples in Mexico City